The Raja Haji Fisabilillah Mosque or Cyberjaya Mosque is a principal mosque in Cyberjaya, Sepang, Selangor, Malaysia. This modern futuristic mosque was named after Raja Haji Fisabilillah ibni Daeng Chelak, a Bugis warrior from Penyengat Island, Indonesia. He was also the Yang Dipertuan Muda (Crown Prince) of the Johor-Riau Sultanate from 1777 to 1784.

History
The mosque was constructed from 5 April 2013 and was completed on 24 February 2015. The mosque was officially opened on 22 June 2016 by the Sultan of Selangor, Sultan Sharafuddin Idris Shah in conjunction with the Nuzul Quran celebration on 17 Ramadan 1437 Hijra.

See also

 Islam in Malaysia

References

External links
Raja Haji Fisabilillah Mosque (Cyberjaya Mosque) on Facebook site
Raja Haji Fisabilillah Mosque (Cyberjaya Mosque) blogspot site
 

Mosques in Selangor
2015 establishments in Malaysia
Mosques completed in 2015